Barcroft TV is a British news agency. Sam Barcroft is the founder of the company. Barcroft Media founded itself as an alternative media news agency for weird and unusual news stories. British broadcaster Channel 4 had a controlling stake in Barcroft Media until November 2019 when it was sold to Total Film/SFX publisher Future plc. In 2020, Barcroft TV changed their channel name on YouTube to "truly", with a television channel of the same name due to be launched on the European version of Pluto TV in July 2020. Barcroft also expanded their truly brand to other online web online platforms, including Rumble.

Shows on truly
 Born Different
 Brand New Me 
 Hooked On The Look 
 Love Don’t Judge
 Shake My Beauty

References

2004 establishments in the United Kingdom
YouTube channels launched in 2006
Entertainment-related YouTube channels
British news websites
Mass media companies established in 2004
News agencies based in the United Kingdom
Mass media companies based in London